Amari Gaan Jhua (1953)  is an Ollywood / Oriya film directed by Binaya Banarjee.

Cast
 Gopal Banarjee
 Parbati Ghose
 Durlabh
 Gaura Ghosh
 Chapala Nayak
 Bhanumati Devi

Soundtrack 
 "Pahili Ashadha Ra Ashanta Badala Tu Re"

References

External links
 

1953 films
1950s Odia-language films
1953 drama films
Indian drama films
Indian black-and-white films